is a Japanese football player, who plays for Kyoto Sanga FC as a defender.

Career
Miyagi attended Komazawa University, where he won the 39th Prime Minister Cup in July 2010. He was signed by Tochigi Uva in his rookie season.

After leaving because out of contract, Miyagi signed a new deal with JFL newly promoted side Renofa Yamaguchi. He had the opportunity to play as forward, but in the end the club registered him as defender, despite scoring 11 goals in two season. Miyagi was instrumental to win the J3 League in 2015, gaining the first promotion in J2 for Renofa.

Club statistics
Updated to end of 2018 season.

References

External links
Profile at Kyoto Sanga
Profile at Renofa Yamaguchi

1991 births
Living people
Komazawa University alumni
Association football people from Okinawa Prefecture
Japanese footballers
J2 League players
J3 League players
Japan Football League players
Tochigi City FC players
Renofa Yamaguchi FC players
Kyoto Sanga FC players
Association football defenders